Harry Alexander Dunlop (September 6, 1933 - November 16, 2022) was an American former catcher, coach and manager in professional baseball.

Catcher for Necciai's 27-strikeout game
Dunlop batted left-handed, threw right-handed, stood 6'3" (190.5 cm) tall and weighed 200 pounds (91 kg). He played in the farm system of the Pittsburgh Pirates from  through —missing the 1953–54 seasons due to military service—but his most famous achievement came during his 16-game stint with his first team, the Bristol Twins of the Class D Appalachian League. Between May 13 and May 26, 1952, Dunlop caught three no-hitters from Bristol pitchers, one from Ron Necciai in which Necciai struck out a record 27 batters in a nine-inning game, and two no-hitters from teammate Bill Bell.

The Necciai game is regarded as one of the most outstanding achievements in baseball history. While he recorded 27 strikeouts and one ground ball out, Necciai had to garner 28 outs in the game because of a passed ball by Dunlop on a strikeout in the ninth inning. "That was the first of three no-hitters I caught in 14 days", Dunlop said 35 years later. "But it was the only professional game anyone ever caught in which a pitcher struck out 27 batters in nine innings. I felt like a celebrity after it. I told [manager] George Detore, I said, 'George, I called a helluva game, didn't I?' You know what? George just looked at me and said, 'Why'd you call that pitch to so-and-so in the sixth?'"

Minor league manager
Dunlop's celebrity was short-lived. His playing career stalled in 1956 with the New Orleans Pelicans of the Class AA Southern Association and he was released by the Pirates the following season. He kept his baseball career going, however, as the playing manager of the unaffiliated Tucson Cowboys of the Class C Arizona–Mexico League. The Cowboys finished second in the league in 1958, and Dunlop batted .349.

By 1961, Dunlop had joined the minor league managerial staff of the Baltimore Orioles, with the Stockton Ports of the Class C California League.

Major League coach
He spent seven seasons (1969–75) as a coach with Kansas City, then served on the staffs of the Chicago Cubs (1976), Cincinnati Reds (1979–82), and San Diego Padres (1983–87).

During his Kansas City tenure, he worked for 2½ years (1973 through mid-1975) under Royals manager Jack McKeon, like Dunlop a former minor league catcher in the Pirates' organization, and the two formed a strong professional association. McKeon was the general manager of the Padres when Dunlop coached for San Diego; he then moved Dunlop into the Padre farm system as field coordinator of minor league instruction (1988–90). McKeon also named Dunlop to his coaching staff in his late-career managerial assignments with the Reds (1998–2000) and Florida Marlins, for whom Dunlop served as a coach in  when he was 71 years of age, and McKeon, his boss, was 74.

He recently wrote a book "50 Years in a Kid's Game." Dunlop passed away on November 16, 2022, at the age of 89.

References

External links

Jordan, Pat, Kid K, Sports Illustrated, June 1, 1987

Marcin, Joe, ed., The Official 1970 Baseball Register, St. Louis: The Sporting News, 1970.
The Major League Baseball Directory, 1988-89-90 editions. Durham, North Carolina: Baseball America, 1988, 1989, 1990.
Johnson, Lloyd, and Wolff, Miles, eds., The Encyclopedia of Minor League Baseball, 3rd edition. Durham, North Carolina: Baseball America, 2007.

Living people
1933 births
Baseball players from Sacramento, California
Bristol Twins players
Burlington-Graham Pirates players
Chicago Cubs coaches
Cincinnati Reds coaches
Florida Marlins coaches
Kansas City Royals coaches
Las Vegas 51s managers
Lincoln Chiefs players
Major League Baseball bench coaches
Major League Baseball bullpen coaches
Major League Baseball third base coaches
Milwaukee Brewers scouts
New Orleans Pelicans (baseball) players
New York Mets scouts
Quad Cities Angels players
Seattle Angels players
San Diego Padres coaches
Stockton Ports players
Tri-City Braves players
Tucson Cowboys players